Coigneux is a commune in the Somme department and Hauts-de-France region of northern France.

Geography
The source of the Authie river is found here.

Population

See also
 Communes of the Somme department

References

Communes of Somme (department)